David Sullivan Kaplan (born July 9, 1979 in New York) is an American drummer and member of the London-based band Razorlight.

Career
Kaplan started his career in the Long Island-based The Reunion Show, which split in 2004. He briefly was a member of Action Action before later joining six-man dance-rock ensemble Men, Women & Children. When Andy Burrows left Razorlight, “Skully”  took over the drums. Initially it was reported he would be in the band as a touring member until the end of 2009; since then he has become an official member.

References

External links
Razorlight official site

Living people
Razorlight members
1979 births